Groote Schuur (Dutch for "big shed") is an estate in Cape Town, South Africa. In 1657, the estate was owned by the Dutch East India Company which used it partly as a granary. Later, the farm and farmhouse was sold into private hands. Groote Schuur was later acquired by William De Smidt, and remained in the family's possession until it was sold by Abraham De Smidt, Surveyor General of the Cape Colony, in 1878, and was bought by Hester Anna van der Byl of the prominent Van Der Byl / Coetsee family. In 1891 Cecil Rhodes leased it from her. He later bought it from her in 1893 for £60 000, and had it converted and refurbished by the architect Sir Herbert Baker. The Cape Dutch building, located in Rondebosch, on the slopes of Devil's Peak, the outlying shoulder of Table Mountain, was originally part of the Dutch East India Company's granary constructed in the seventeenth century.

Little of the original house remained after a fire in 1896. The traditional thatched roof was replaced by sturdier Welsh slates. Rhodes gave no strict instructions as to what he wanted from Baker. Rhodes abhorred any mechanically made items (such as hinges for windows) in the house and set out to remove them and have them replaced with brass and bronze items that would be cast. Baker replaced the front of the house, added a long stoep in the back and constructed a new wing. The wing contained a billiard room and master bedroom above on the second floor that contained a large bay window overlooking Devil's Peak. He also added a grand hall with a massive fireplace.

Sir Herbert Baker also played a significant role in the furnishing of the house. After initially furnishing with modern furniture from London, Rhodes, influenced by Baker, began a shift from the modern to more traditional Cape furniture. This would mark the beginning of Cecil Rhodes’ collection of colonial furnishings.

The gardens of the house were as Rhodes demanded 'masses of colour'. Surrounding the house was a mass of roses, hydrangeas, cannas, bougainvilleas and fuchsias. Farther away from the house on the slopes of Devil's Peak, Rhodes kept antelopes, zebra, eland, wildebeest and ostriches.

Rhodes was always a generous host while at Groote Schuur. He used the residence as much as a business and political headquarters as a home. His life at the time was one of dinner parties and meetings on the stoep, where he would be joined by as many as fifty people.

From 1910 to 1984, it was the official Cape residence of the Prime Ministers of South Africa and continued as a presidential residence of P. W. Botha and F. W. De Klerk. However, P.W. Botha never resided there, opting rather to live in Westbrooke.

In May 1956, Time magazine reported, "a party was held at Groote Schuur for South Africa's Nationalist Prime Minister Johannes Strydom after he had won the parliamentary campaign to continue white supremacy in a land of 2.6 million whites and 10 million nonwhites. The party was given by some of the younger nationalists and their wives to honor him. They organized a caravan of 130 vehicles and slowly drove up to the Groote Schuur. After reaching the house, they began to sing old Boer war songs—the Volksliederen of the Transvaal and Orange Free State. A speech was given by Mrs. M.D.J. Koster, the only female member of the parliament, 'Every white woman and every white mother thanks you from the depth of her heart.' Strydom’s response to this was, 'We must never be swerved from our goals...the struggle must continue.

The building was the site for the signing of the historic "Groote Schuur Minute" between Nelson Mandela, of the African National Congress (ANC), and F.W. De Klerk, the then State President of the Republic of South Africa, on 4 May 1990. The document was a commitment between the two parties towards the resolution of the existing climate of violence and intimidation as well as a commitment to stability and to a peaceful process of negotiations.
A working party was established to investigate the granting of temporary immunity to ANC cadres, to advise on how to deal with the release of political prisoners and to make recommendations on the definition of political offences.

Under Nelson Mandela, as President of the Republic of South Africa, the Genadendal building (formerly called Westbrooke) became the Cape Town residence of the South African President. Groote Schuur is now a museum and open to the public only by appointment.

See also
 Genadendal Residence
 List of Castles and Fortifications in South Africa
 Highstead, official residence of the Deputy President

References

External links

Groote Schuur - Department of Public Works site
Text of the Groote Schuur Minute

Rondebosch
Buildings and structures in Cape Town
Presidential residences
Herbert Baker buildings and structures
Museums in Cape Town
Historic house museums in South Africa
Official residences in South Africa
Cecil Rhodes